Spilarctia obliquizonata is a moth in the family Erebidae. It was described by Tsunekata Miyake in 1910. It is found in the Russian Far East (southern Sakhalin, Kunashir) and Japan.

References

Moths described in 1910
obliquizonata